Kelermesskaya is a rural locality (a stanitsa) and the administrative center of Kelermesskoye Rural Settlement of Giaginsky District, Adygea, Russia. The population was 2844 as of 2018. There are 26 streets.

Geography 
The stanitsa is located in the steppe zone, 12 km southeast of Giaginskaya (the district's administrative centre) by road. Lesnoy is the nearest rural locality.

References 

Rural localities in Giaginsky District